The Pest is a 1922 American silent comedy film starring Stan Laurel as Jimmy Smith, who is going door to door hoping to sell copies of a book about Napoleon Bonaparte. He encounters a young woman who will be evicted from her house unless she agrees to marry the landlord. He vows to get the money she needs.

Cast
 Stan Laurel as Jimmy Smith
 Glen Cavender as The landlord
 Vera Reynolds as The poor tenant
 Joy Winthrop as The pest
 Mae Laurel as A woman in court

See also
 List of American films of 1922
 Mixed Nuts (1922) film using footage from The Pest and Nuts in May (1917)

References

External links

1922 films
1922 comedy films
1922 short films
American silent short films
American black-and-white films
Silent American comedy films
Films directed by Broncho Billy Anderson
American comedy short films
1920s American films
1920s English-language films